Sergio Sagarzazu (born 11 September 1987) is an Argentine professional footballer who plays as a midfielder for Sarmiento de Resistencia.

Career
Sagarzazu played for Excursionistas and River Plate in his youth career. He departed the latter in 2007 to join German Regionalliga Nord side SV Wilhelmshaven. He made his debut on 4 March 2007 against Bayer Leverkusen II, before scoring his first goal a week later versus Kickers Emden. The club were relegated at the conclusion of 2006–07. He spent one season in Oberliga Nord, making twenty-seven appearances as SV Wilhelmshaven were promoted back up to tier four. He departed in 2008 after two years and thirty-eight appearances for the Germans, though controversy arose three years later.

Sagarzazu's ex-clubs, Excursionistas and River Plate, filed a lawsuit with FIFA over unpaid bonuses; which his club denied. In 2014, FIFA sided with the aforementioned teams and SV Wilhelmshaven were relegated from the 2013–14 Regionalliga. Two years later, in 2016, the Federal Court of Justice and Oberlandesgericht cleared SV Wilhelmshaven of any wrongdoing. After leaving German football in 2008, Sagarzazu subsequently joined San Martín (T). However, despite spending four years with San Martín (T), he never played for them; instead, being loaned out on two occasions.

Firstly to Estudiantes, and then to Unión Sunchales. For the two clubs, he featured forty-nine times and scored twice. After leaving San Martín (T), he had spells with Chacarita Juniors, Crucero del Norte, Gimnasia y Esgrima and Guaraní Antonio Franco between 2012 and 2015. On 6 January 2016, San Martín (SJ) of the Argentine Primera División signed Sagarzazu. His debut arrived against Godoy Cruz on 23 April, which was followed by a goal in appearance two versus Atlético Tucumán on 13 May. He played six further matches for San Martín (SJ) before departing ahead of 2017–18.

For the 2017–18 campaign, Sagarzazu spent it in Primera B Nacional with Juventud Unida. One goal in twenty-two games occurred for Sagarzazu, in a season which ended in relegation. On 23 May 2018, Primera B Nacional's Los Andes became Sagarzazu's eleventh senior club.

Career statistics

References

External links

1987 births
Living people
Footballers from Buenos Aires
Argentine footballers
Association football midfielders
Argentine expatriate footballers
Expatriate footballers in Germany
Argentine expatriate sportspeople in Germany
Regionalliga players
Oberliga (football) players
Argentine Primera División players
Primera Nacional players
Torneo Argentino A players
Primera B Metropolitana players
SV Wilhelmshaven players
San Martín de Tucumán footballers
Estudiantes de Buenos Aires footballers
Unión de Sunchales footballers
Chacarita Juniors footballers
Crucero del Norte footballers
Gimnasia y Esgrima de Concepción del Uruguay footballers
Guaraní Antonio Franco footballers
San Martín de San Juan footballers
Juventud Unida de Gualeguaychú players
Club Atlético Los Andes footballers
Sarmiento de Resistencia footballers